The Hawaiʻi Bowl is a college football bowl game that has been played in the Honolulu, Hawaii area since 2002. The game was originally held at Aloha Stadium in Halawa, Hawaii, a suburb of Honolulu, before moving to the Clarence T. C. Ching Athletics Complex in 2022. The bowl is one of the post-season contests run by ESPN Events. Typically played on or near Christmas Eve, the bowl normally features a team from the Mountain West Conference, playing a team from either the American Athletic Conference or Conference USA. Since the 2021 edition of the bowl, it is sponsored by EasyPost. Previous sponsors include ConAgra Foods (2002) and Sheraton Hotels and Resorts Hawaii (2003–2013), and SoFi (2018–2019).

For practical and logistical reasons, the Mountain West Conference's tie-in is automatically allocated to the Hawaii Rainbow Warriors if the team is bowl-eligible, and was not selected to play in a New Year's Six (or previously, BCS) bowl game. This means that the Rainbow Warriors do not have to travel to the mainland for a bowl game unless it is of significant importance. As a result of this practice, the Rainbow Warriors have made the most appearances in the game, at nine.

The 2020 edition of the bowl was cancelled in October due to the COVID-19 pandemic and related travel restrictions. The 2021 edition was canceled the day before kickoff, after the Rainbow Warriors were forced to withdraw due to COVID-19 issues.

Bowl games in Hawaii
The Hawaii Bowl is not affiliated with other bowl games previously staged in Hawaii: the Poi Bowl (1936–1939), Pineapple Bowl (1940–1941, 1947–1952), Aloha Bowl (1982–2000), and Oahu Bowl (1998–2000), or the Hula Bowl all-star game (1960–2008, and resuming in 2020). While the Aloha Bowl tried to move to San Francisco, California, and was decertified by the NCAA, the Oahu Bowl was moved to Seattle, Washington, and was held for two years as the Seattle Bowl before losing certification in 2002.

Game history
In its first year, the Hawai'i Bowl was sponsored by ConAgra Foods. The following year, Sheraton Hotels and Resorts Hawaii assumed sponsorship; the game's full name was changed to the Sheraton Hawai'i Bowl until Sheraton declined to renew sponsorship in 2014.  In 2018, SoFi signed on as title sponsor of the game which is officially known as the SoFi Hawai'i Bowl.

The current Mountain West tie-in was held by the Western Athletic Conference (WAC) until 2012, when the WAC ceased sponsoring college football, and Hawaii moved to the Mountain West.

The first two editions were played on the Aloha Bowl's traditional Christmas Day date, but ESPN's acquisition of NBA rights came with the league's Christmas Day games, thus the game moved to Christmas Eve after 2004 in most years.

The 2005 appearance of the UCF Knights at the Hawaii Bowl was the first ever bowl game in that school's history. In 2006, the Pac-10 replaced Conference USA (C-USA) as the WAC's opposition, with C-USA as an alternate. Since Christmas Eve fell on a Monday in 2007, the game was scheduled for the night prior (December 23) to avoid a conflict with Monday Night Football (also on ESPN). In 2008, the bowl organizers selected Notre Dame as an at-large bid, marking the first time an independent played in the contest. C-USA again became a primary tie-in starting in 2009. The 2011 game featured the C-USA champion for the first time, as Southern Mississippi played instead of going to the Liberty Bowl, where the C-USA champion typically played at the time. The bowl featured the Mountain West champion for the first time in 2015, as San Diego State played instead of going to the Las Vegas Bowl, where the Mountain West champion typically plays.

Between 2002 and 2018, C-USA sent a team to the bowl 12 times, registering an 8–4 record. In 2019, the American Athletic Conference (The American) superseded C-USA as the primary tie-in to face a Mountain West team (or independent BYU).

On October 2, ESPN Events announced that the 2020 edition of the bowl game had been canceled due to the COVID-19 pandemic.

On August 10, 2021 EasyPost was announced as the new sponsor of the bowl. On December 23, 2021, the game was cancelled for the second consecutive season, after the Rainbow Warriors withdrew due to injuries and COVID-19 issues within the team.

(2011)
To celebrate the tenth anniversary of the Hawai'i Bowl, the Honolulu Star-Advertiser, in conjunction with the bowl game, allowed fans to vote on a tenth anniversary team. Nine players were selected by a public vote, and an additional seven players were picked by a panel of sportswriters and organizers. The team was announced on December 16, 2011.

Game results

Source:

MVPs
The bowl named an MVP from each team from inception through the 2019 edition.

Source:

Since the 2022 playing, the award—given to a single player—has been known as the Hugh Yoshida Most Valuable Player Award, honoring a former athletic director at the University of Hawaii.

Most appearances
Updated through the December 2022 edition (19 games, 38 total appearances).

Teams with multiple appearances

Teams with a single appearance
Won (8): East Carolina, Louisiana Tech, Notre Dame, Oregon State, Rice, Southern Miss, Tulane, Tulsa

Lost (5): Arizona State, BYU, Cincinnati, UAB, UCF

Appearances by conference
Updated through the December 2022 edition (19 games, 38 total appearances).

 Pac-12 record includes appearances when the conference was known as the Pac-10 (before 2011).
 The WAC no longer sponsors FBS football.
 Independent appearances: Notre Dame (2008), BYU (2019)

Game records

Source:

Media coverage

The bowl has been televised on ESPN since its inception.

Notes

References

External links
 

 
College football bowls
American football in Hawaii
College sports in Hawaii
Recurring sporting events established in 2002